Anegawa Dam is a gravity dam located in Shiga prefecture in Japan. The dam is used for flood control and power production. The catchment area of the dam is 28.3 km2. The dam impounds about 33  ha of land when full and can store 7600 thousand cubic meters of water. The construction of the dam was started on 1977 and completed in 2002.

References

Dams in Shiga Prefecture
2002 establishments in Japan